Lorenzo Amurri (1971 – 12 July 2016) was an Italian writer and musician.

Biography
Amurri was born in Rome in 1971. He turned to writing after a skiing accident that left him a quadriplegic. His short stories  appear in a collection titled Amore Caro. His first novel Apnea won the 2015 EU Prize for Literature.

As a musician, Amurri worked with Italian artists such as Tiromancino and Franco Califano.

References

1971 births
2016 deaths
Italian male writers
Writers from Rome
People with tetraplegia
21st-century Italian writers